The District Championship of Lourenço Marques was a competition for association football clubs in the then officially Portuguese Province Mozambique and was held 40 times between 1922 ad 1961. Participants were the clubs of Lourenço Marques, today's  Maputo, the capital of the country. Till the introduction of the national championship in 1956 this was the most important competition of Mozambique.

Ferroviário Lourenço Marques holds the record with 14 title wins, ahead of Desportivo and 
Sporting, today's CD Maxaquene, with 12 and 9 wins, respectively. The no longer existing clubs Athletic and Clube Indo-Português won two, respectively one of altogether 38 district championships awarded.

Winners 
 1922: Sporting Clube de Lourenço Marques
 1923: Athletic
 1924: Clube Indo-Português
 1925: Grupo Desportivo de Lourenço Marques
 1926: Grupo Desportivo de Lourenço Marques
 1927: Grupo Desportivo de Lourenço Marques
 1928: Athletic
 1929: Grupo Desportivo de Lourenço Marques
 1930: Sporting Clube de Lourenço Marques
 1931: Ferroviário Lourenço Marques
 1932: Ferroviário Lourenço Marques
 1933: Sporting Clube de Lourenço Marques
 1934: Ferroviário Lourenço Marques
 1935: Ferroviário Lourenço Marques
 1936: Ferroviário Lourenço Marques
 1937: Grupo Desportivo de Lourenço Marques
 1938: Sporting Clube de Lourenço Marques
 1939: Ferroviário Lourenço Marques
 1940: Sporting Clube de Lourenço Marques
 1941: -- no title awarded --
 1942: Ferroviário Lourenço Marques
 1943: Sporting Clube de Lourenço Marques
 1944: Grupo Desportivo de Lourenço Marques
 1945: Grupo Desportivo de Lourenço Marques
 1946: Grupo Desportivo de Lourenço Marques
 1947: Ferroviário Lourenço Marques
 1948: Sporting Clube de Lourenço Marques
 1949: Ferroviário Lourenço Marques
 1950: Ferroviário Lourenço Marques
 1951: Ferroviário Lourenço Marques
 1952: Grupo Desportivo de Lourenço Marques
 1953: Sporting Clube de Lourenço Marques
 1954: Ferroviário Lourenço Marques
 1955: Ferroviário Lourenço Marques
 1956: Grupo Desportivo de Lourenço Marques
 1957: Grupo Desportivo de Lourenço Marques
 1958: Ferroviário Lourenço Marques
 1959: Grupo Desportivo de Lourenço Marques
 1960: Sporting Clube de Lourenço Marques
 1961:  -- no title awarded --

External links 
 Todor Krastev, Julio Bovi Diogo, José Batalha: Mozambique - List of Champions, RSSSF, 15 November 2012.

Football competitions in Mozambique
Recurring sporting events established in 1922